Gulston may refer to:

Francis Gulston (1845-1917), English rower
Joseph Gulston (disambiguation), three persons of that name
Theodore Goulston or Gulston (1572–1632), English physician and scholar
William Gulston (1636-1684), Bishop of Bristol